Machimus arthriticus is a Palearctic species of robber fly in the family Asilidae.

References

External links
Geller Grim Robberflies oF Germany
Images representing Machimus arthriticus

Asilidae
Insects described in 1840
Diptera of Europe